Barbara Chernow is an American educator and since March 2015, Executive Vice President for Finance and Administration at Brown University. She served as Senior Vice President for Administration at Stony Brook University from 2012 to 2015. On December 12, 2014 Chernow was named as the next Executive Vice President of Finance and Administration at Brown University.

Early life and education

Born in New Hyde Park, Long Island, raised  in Brooklyn and Staten Island, Chernow attended Susan E. Wagner High School in Staten Island. She went on to attend Brown University and graduated with a BA in Economics and a minor in Education. At Brown, she was active among Brown Student Agencies.

Chernow currently resides in Rhode Island with her husband. Her daughter is a graduate of the University of Vermont and her son graduated from Cornell University.

Work

As Executive Vice President for Finance and Administration, Chernow oversees Brown University's administrative side, which includes Facilities and Services, Budget, Human Resources, Audit and Finance, with direct responsibility for all administrative, business and facilities operations, including design and construction activity throughout Brown University. 
In this role she assists the President of Brown University Christina Paxson in defining the future goals and administrative plans for the University. Her current assistant's name is Carlyn Hansen-Decelles. Chernow is a member of the Society for College and University Planning (SCUP).

At Stony Brook University Chernow held the Chair of the Project 50 Forward Operational Excellence Program Management Office, which oversaw efforts to streamline procedures, optimize programs and improve support services campus-wide. From October 2007 to October 2013 Barbara served as President of Stony Brook University's Faculty Student Association, the not-for-profit organization that provides dining, retail and other auxiliary services to the Stony Brook campus community. Chernow was a member of State University of New York Business Officers' Association (SUBOA). Chernow first joined Stony Brook University in 1998 as a special assistant to then President of Stony Brook University, Shirley Strum Kenny.

During her more than 35-year career, Chernow has held a variety of senior management positions in facilities and operations including serving as the Vice President of Administration for the New York City School Construction Authority and as Director of the New York City Board of Education's Office of Pupil Transportation.  She was also a past recipient of the Executive Leadership Award presented by the National Association of Professional Women in Construction.

References

External links
Brown University Announces Chernow Appointment

Living people
Brown University faculty
People from Brooklyn
Stony Brook University faculty
Brown University alumni
People from New Hyde Park, New York
Year of birth missing (living people)